was a Japanese samurai warrior of  the Sengoku period. He is known as one of the "Twenty-Four Generals of Takeda Shingen". He once became a vassal of the Later Hojo clan, but returned to Kai and became a vassal of Takeda Shingen.

References

External links 
  "Legendary Takeda's 24 Generals" at Yamanashi-kankou.jp

1497 births
1564 deaths
Samurai
Takeda retainers
People from Chiba Prefecture